Infernal Battles is the first album by the black metal band Deathspell Omega. It was released in 2000 by Northern Heritage Records in a limited run of 200 vinyl copies, then re-released in 2003 by the same label and in 2010 by End All Life Productions, both times on CD.

"Drink the Devil's Blood" was later reworked and re-recorded for their 2004 album Si monvmentvm reqvires, circvmspice. The album's second side, with tracks 5-8, is a full reissue of the band's demo Disciples of the Ultimate Void.

The band note in a 2019 interview that the only songs on which they had ever used a drum machine were the first four tracks of Infernal Battles. The last four, being a re-release of their demo, featured their original drummer.

Track listing

References

Deathspell Omega albums
2000 debut albums